Melaleuca howeana, commonly known as tea tree, is a plant in the myrtle family, Myrtaceae and is endemic to the Lord Howe Island group,  off the east coast of Australia. It is common in exposed areas, on cliffs and ridges, occasionally forming pure stands. Its closest mainland relative is Melaleuca ericifolia.

Description
Its young branchlets have fine, soft, silky hairs but become glabrous with age.

The flowers are white,  arranged in spikes at the ends of branches which continue to grow after flowering. The stamens are arranged in five bundles around the flower with 6 to 12 stamens per bundle.

Taxonomy and naming
Melaleuca howeana was first formally described in 1924 by Edwin Cheel in Journal and Proceedings of the Royal Society of New South Wales. The specific epithet (howeana) refers to Lord Howe Island.

Distribution and habitat
Melaleuca howeana occurs on Lord Howe Island and Ball's Pyramid. It is common, especially in sites exposed to salt spray such as on the seashore and sea cliffs but also on ridges further inland.

Ecology
Melaleuca howeana provides habitat for the Lord Howe Island stick insect Dryococelus australis, a critically endangered species. A specimen on Ball's Pyramid is growing in a small crevice where water seeps through cracks in the underlying rocks. This moisture supports a relatively lush plant growth which resulted in a build-up of plant debris, several metres deep. The insects have been bred in captivity and returned to Lord Howe Island.

References

Endemic flora of Lord Howe Island
howeana
Plants described in 1924
Taxa named by Edwin Cheel